TheGrandjean family is a Danish family of French ancestry with several notable members. The manor house Vennerslund on the island of Falster has been owned by members of the family since 1809. The family is also associated with the historic Grandjean House on Bredgade in Copenhagen.

Origins
It is believed that the Grandjean originates in the environs of Luon. Augustinus Grandjean (c. 1640–1714) emigrated to Denmark during the reign of Christian V and was in 1685 registered as quartermaster at kvartermester ved oberst Rabe's cavalry regiment.

Notable family members
 
  Christian Frederik Bredo Grandjean (1811–1877), pastrymaker and builder of the Grandjean House
  Harald Frederik Grandjean (1841–1925), military officer and historian
 Axel Grandjean (1847–1932), composer and conductor
 Emile Grandjean (1861–1942), forester
 Poul Bredo Grandjean (1880–1957), heraldryst and Danish National Archives archivist
 Vincens Grandjean (1898–1970), landowner, military officer, chamberlain, hofjægermester and Olympic rider
 Tove Elisabeth Grandjean née Madsen (1908–1997), actress
 Bredo L. Grandjean (1916–1986), art historian
 Austin Grandjean (1930–2006), graphic designer
 Susanne Brockenhuus-Schack née Grandjean (born 1938), countess and landowner
 Philippe Grandjean (born 1950), scientist
 Nikolaj Grandjean (born 1973), singer, songwriter and music producer

References

Danish families
Families of French ancestry